This was the first edition of the tournament.

Hans Hach Verdugo and Miguel Ángel Reyes-Varela won the title after defeating Vladyslav Manafov and Piotr Matuszewski 6–4, 6–4 in the final.

Seeds

Draw

References

External links
 Main draw

BNP Paribas Polish Cup - Doubles